In enzymology, a dCTP diphosphatase is an enzyme that catalyzes the chemical reaction

dCTP + H2O  dCMP + diphosphate

Thus, the two substrates of this enzyme are dCTP and H2O, whereas its two products are dCMP and diphosphate.

This enzyme belongs to the family of hydrolases, specifically those acting on acid anhydrides in phosphorus-containing anhydrides.  The systematic name of this enzyme class is dCTP nucleotidohydrolase. Other names in common use include deoxycytidine-triphosphatase, dCTPase, dCTP pyrophosphatase, deoxycytidine triphosphatase, deoxy-CTPase, and dCTPase.  This enzyme participates in pyrimidine metabolism.

References 

 

EC 3.6.1
Enzymes of unknown structure